The 2001 Fed Cup was the 39th edition of the most important competition between national teams in women's tennis.

The World Group was held at the Parque Ferial Juan Carlos I in Madrid, Spain, from 7–11 November. It was reduced from thirteen to eight teams, divided into two pools, with the winners meeting in the finals. In the final, Belgium defeated Russia, giving Belgium their first title.

World Group play-offs

First round
Dates: 28–29 April

The winners of Zonal Competition from the last year (Argentina, Hungary, Japan) were randomly drawn against five teams from the 2000 World Group pools. The winners were guaranteed a spot in the World Group next year.

Second Rounds
Dates: 21–22 July

The winners of the first round played off against four other teams from the 2000 World Group pools, with the winners proceeding to the World Group. The losers of the first round played off against this year's zonal competition winners, with the winners remaining in World Group for next year, and the losers proceeding to Zonal Competition for next year.

Note: Germany, as the highest-ranked of the 2nd round losers in the ITF's Fed Cup rankings, replaced the defending champions United States in the World Group after the US withdrew citing security risks following the September 11 attacks.

World Group

All ties were played at the Parque Ferial Juan Carlos I, Madrid, Spain, on indoor clay courts.

 Nations in bold advanced to the higher level of competition.

Pool A
 
 
 
 
Pool B

Final

Americas Zone

 Nations in bold advanced to the higher level of competition.
 Nations in italics were relegated down to a lower level of competition.

Group I
Venue: Montevideo, Uruguay (outdoor clay)

Dates: 23–28 April

Participating Teams

Group II
Venue: St. John's, Antigua and Barbuda (outdoor hard)

Dates: 15–19 May

Participating Teams

Asia/Oceania Zone

 Nations in bold advanced to the higher level of competition.
 Nations in italics were relegated down to a lower level of competition.

Group I
Venue: Kaohsiung, Chinese Taipei (outdoor hard)

Dates: 9–14 April

Participating Teams

 
 
 
 
 
 
 Pacific Oceania

Group II
Venue: Kaohsiung, Chinese Taipei (outdoor hard)

Dates: 9–14 April

Participating Teams

Europe/Africa Zone

 Nations in bold advanced to the higher level of competition.
 Nations in italics were relegated down to a lower level of competition.

Group I
Venue: Murcia, Spain (outdoor clay)

Dates: 24–28 April

Participating Teams

Group II
Venue: Belek, Antalya, Turkey (outdoor clay)

Dates: 14–17 May

Participating Teams

References

External links 
 Fed Cup

 
Billie Jean King Cups by year
Fed
2001 in women's tennis